ARA Hércules is a former Type 42 destroyer of the Argentine Navy (Spanish:  Armada de la República Argentina), which was transformed into a multi-purpose transport ship with the pennant number B-52 (previously D-1) and assigned to the amphibious force in 1999.

History 

The ship was ordered on 18 May 1970 and completed on 10 May 1976 at the Vickers Shipbuilding yard in Barrow-in-Furness, United Kingdom. During construction, an explosion on  caused damage in the hull. The hull of Hércules replaced a section of the ship, as both were identical in build. She was delivered to Argentina and entered service on 19 September 1977. As built, Hércules was identical to the initial Type 42 units being commissioned by the Royal Navy. The Argentine Navy upgraded the warship by enhancing her offensive capabilities with MM-38 Exocet anti-ship missiles. The original boat decks by the funnel were modified in order to mount the launchers.

In 1982, along with her newly built sister ship, Hércules was part of the escort of the aircraft carrier  during the Falklands War.

The ship had a major conversion at ASMAR in Talcahuano, Chile in 2000 that removed the anti-aircraft and anti-ship missile systems to allow the embarkment of a complement of 238 marine infantry troops, the flight deck and hangar were also enlarged to allow her to operate two Sea King helicopters. Each helicopter can also carry two AM-39 Exocet anti-ship missiles.

As of 2020, Hércules was reported to be non-operational.

References

Notes

Bibliography

See also 
 List of ships of the Argentine Navy
 List of auxiliary ships of the Argentine Navy

Type 42 destroyers of the Argentine Navy
Ships built in Barrow-in-Furness
1976 ships
Falklands War naval ships of Argentina
Cold War destroyers of Argentina